The Mariah 27 is an American sailboat that was designed by Graham & Schlageter as a Midget Ocean Racing Club (MORC) racer and first built in 1986.

The design is very similar to the G&S 27, which was designed the same year by Graham & Schlageter.

Design
The Mariah 27 is a racing keelboat, built predominantly of fiberglass. It has a masthead sloop rig, an internally mounted spade-type rudder controlled by a tiller and a fixed fin keel. It displaces  and carries  of ballast.

The boat is normally fitted with a small outboard motor for docking and maneuvering.

See also
List of sailing boat types

References

Keelboats
1980s sailboat type designs
Sailing yachts
Sailboat types built in the United States
Sailboat type designs by Graham & Schlageter